Amalek was a nation described in the Hebrew Bible as a staunch enemy of the Israelites. The name "Amalek" can refer to the nation's founder, a grandson of Esau; his descendants, the Amalekites; or the territories of Amalek, which they inhabited.

Etymology

Amalekites in the Hebrew Bible

According to the Bible, Amalek was the son of Eliphaz (himself the son of Esau, ancestor of the Edomites) and Eliphaz's concubine Timna. Timna was a Horite and sister of Lotan. Amalek is described as the "chief of Amalek" among the "chiefs of the sons of Esau", from which it is surmised that he ruled a clan or territory named after him.

The Amalekites were considered to be Amalek's descendants through the genealogy of Esau. In the oracle of Balaam, Amalek was called the 'first of the nations'. One modern scholar believes this attests to Amalek's high antiquity, while traditional commentator Rashi states: "He came before all of them to make war with Israel". First-century Roman-Jewish scholar and historian Flavius Josephus refers to Amalek as a 'bastard' in a derogatory sense.

According to the Bible, the Amalekites inhabited the Negev. They appear to have lived a nomadic or seminomadic lifestyle along the fringes of southern Canaan's agricultural zone. This is probably based on the association of this tribal group with the steppe region of ancient Israel and the area of Kadesh (Genesis 14:7).

As a people, the Amalekites were identified as a recurrent enemy of the Israelites. This role appears in several stories:
 In , Amalek makes war against Israel in the wilderness. Joshua is ordered by Moses to lead Israel in battle, and Moses watches from a hillside. When Moses' hand is raised, Israel prevails, but when it is lowered, Israel falters. So he keeps his hand raised through the entire battle, even having assistants hold him up, so that the battle will go to Israel.
 In , The Israelites are specifically commanded to "blot out the remembrance of Amalek from under heaven" once they have taken possession of the promised land in retribution for "what Amalek did to [them] on the way as [they] were coming out of Egypt."
 In , Samuel identifies Amalek as the enemy of Israelites, saying "Thus says the Lord of hosts: I will punish Amalek for what he did to Israel, how he ambushed him on the way when he came up from Egypt."  God then commands Saul to destroy the Amalekites. In , Samuel identifies king Agag of Amalek as an enemy and killer, saying "As your sword has made women childless, so shall your mother be childless among women.”
The future king David led a successful mission against the Amalekites to recover "all that the Amalekites had carried away".
 In , an Amalekite tells David that he found Saul leaning on his spear after the battle of Gilboa.  The Amalekite claims he euthanized Saul, at Saul's request, and removed his crown. David gives orders to his men to kill the Amalekite for killing the anointed king, using his own testimony as reference.

Alternative theories of origins 

In Genesis 14:7, the "field of the Amalekites" is mentioned, though the person Amalek had not yet been born.

Some commentators explain this as a reference to the territory which was later on inhabited by the Amalekites. C. Knight elaborates this concept by making a comparison: one might say "Caesar went into France", though Gaul only later became known as France.

Alternatively, during the Islamic Golden Age, certain Arabic writings claimed that the Amalekites existed long before Abraham. Some Muslim historians claimed that the Amalekites who fought Joshua were descendants of the inhabitants of North Africa. Ibn-Arabshâh purported that Amalek was a descendant of Ham, son of Noah. It is, however, possible that the name Amalek may have been given to two different nations. The Arabians mention Imlik, Amalik, or Ameleka among the aborigines of Arabia, the remains of which were mingled with the descendants of Qahtan (Joktan) and Adnan and became Mostarabs or Mocarabes, that is, Arabians mixed with foreigners.

By the 19th century, there was strong support by Western theologians for the idea that the nation of Amalek could have flourished before the time of Abraham. Matthew George Easton advocated that the Amalekites were not descendants of Amalek by taking a literal approach to Genesis 14:7. However, the modern biblical scholar David Freedman uses textual analysis to glean that the use of Amalekite in Genesis 14:7 is actually an anachronism, and in the early 19th century, Richard Watson enumerated several speculative reasons for having a "more ancient Amalek" than Abraham.

In the exegesis of Numbers 24:20 concerning Balaam's utterance: "Amalek was the first one of the nations, but his end afterward will be even his perishing", Richard Watson attempts to associate this passage to the "first one of the nations" that developed post-Flood. According to Samuel Cox, the Amalekites were the "first" in their hostility toward the Israelites.

Historicity
Although Egyptian and Assyrian monumental inscriptions and records of the period survive which list various tribes and peoples of the area, no reference has ever been found to Amalek or the Amalekites. Therefore, the archaeologist and historian Hugo Winckler suggested in 1895 that there were never any such people and the Biblical stories concerning them are entirely mythological and ahistorical. While considerable knowledge about nomadic Arabs has been recovered through archeological research, no specific artifacts or sites have been linked to Amalek with any certainty. However, it is possible that some of the fortified settlements in the Negev highlands and even Tel Masos (near Beer-sheba) have Amalek connections.

Jewish traditions

According to a midrash, Amalek's mother Timna was a princess who had tried to convert to Judaism but had been rejected by Abraham, Isaac and Jacob. She replied she would rather be a handmaiden to the dregs of this nation than be the mistress of another Nation; to punish the Patriarchs for the affront they had made her, she was made the mother of Amalek, whose descendants would cause Israel much distress.

According to the Midrash, the Amalekites were sorcerers who could transform themselves to resemble animals, in order to avoid capture. Thus, in 1 Samuel 15:3, it was considered necessary to destroy the livestock in order to destroy Amalek.

In Judaism, the Amalekites came to represent the archetypal enemy of the Jews. In Jewish folklore, the Amalekites are considered to be the symbol of evil.

Nur Masalha, Elliot Horowitz, and Josef Stern suggest that Amalekites have come to represent an "eternally irreconcilable enemy" that wants to murder Jews, that Jews in post-biblical times sometimes associate contemporary enemies with Haman or Amalekites, and that some Jews believe that pre-emptive violence is acceptable against such enemies. Groups identified with Amalek include the Romans, Nazis, Stalinists, ISIS,  Palestinians and bellicose Iranian leaders such as Mahmoud Ahmadinejad.

More metaphorically, to some Hasidic rabbis (particularly the Baal Shem Tov), Amalek represents atheism or the rejection of God.

During the Purim festival, the Book of Esther is read in the commemoration of the saving of the Jewish people from Haman who plotted to kill all Jews in Persian Empire. It is customary for the audience to make noise and shout whenever "Haman" is mentioned, in order to desecrate his name, based on Exodus 17:14. It is also customary to recite Deuteronomy 25:17–18 (see below) on the Shabbat before Purim. This was because Haman was considered to be an Amalekite although this label is more likely to be symbolic rather than literal.

Commandment to exterminate the Amalekites

Commandments
In Judaism, three of the 613 mitzvot (commandments) involve Amalek: to remember what the Amalekites did to the Israelites, not to forget what the Amalekites did to Israelites, and to destroy the Amalekites utterly. The rabbis derived these from Deuteronomy 25:17–18, Exodus 17:14 and 1 Samuel 15:3. Rashi explains the third commandment:

As enumerated by Maimonides, the three mitzvot state:

Some commentators have discussed the ethical deficiency of the commandment to exterminate all the Amalekites, especially including the command to kill children, and the presumption of collective punishment. It has also been described as genocidal, according to genocide scholars like Norman Naimark.

Religious and modern scholarly discussion
The commandment to kill Amalekites is not practised by contemporary Jews, based on the argument that Sennacherib deported and mixed the nations, so it is no longer possible to determine who is an Amalekite. For example, Rabbi Hayim Palaggi stated:

In addition, many rabbinic authorities ruled that the commandment only applies to a Jewish king or an organized community, and cannot be performed by an individual. According to Haggahot Maimuniyyot, the commandment applies only in the future messianic era and not in present times; this limitation is almost a consensus among medieval authorities.

Maimonides explains that the commandment to destroy the nation of Amalek requires the Jewish people to peacefully request that they accept upon themselves the Seven Laws of Noah and pay a tax to the Jewish kingdom. Only if they refuse must they be physically killed.

In addition, the Amalekites, as a physical nation, have been extinct since the time of Hezekiah's reign, according to the Hebrew Bible.

A few authorities have ruled that the command never included killing Amalekites. R' Samson Raphael Hirsch said that the command was to destroy "the remembrance of Amalek" rather than actual Amalekites; the Sfat Emet said that the command was to fully hate Amalek rather than performing any action; and the Chofetz Chaim said that God would perform the elimination of Amalek, and Jews are commanded only to remember what Amalek did to them.

Theologian Charles Ellicott explains that the Amalekites were subject to cherem in the Book of Samuel for the purposes of incapacitation, due to their 'accursed' nature and the threat they posed to the commonwealth of surrounding nations.John Gill also describes the cherem as an example of the law of retaliation being carried out.

According to Christian Hofreiter, historically almost all Christian authorities and theologians have interpreted the herem passages as referring to real, historical events when God commanded the Israelites to exterminate all the members of particular nations. He states that "there is practically no historical evidence that anyone in the Great Church" viewed them as being purely an allegory. In particular, Augustine, Thomas Aquinas and John Calvin have defended a literal reading of these passages at length. Origen of Alexandria is sometimes cited as having viewed the herem passages allegorically; Hofreiter argues that although Origen viewed a spiritual interpretation as having primary importance to Christians, he did not deny that the herem passages described historical events.

See also
Agag, ancestor of Haman
Battle of Refidim
Eglon (king)
Herem (war or property)
The Bible and violence
Judaism and violence

Footnotes

References 
 
 
 
 
 
 
 
Sagi, Avi (1994). The Punishment of Amalek in Jewish Tradition: Coping with the Moral Problem, Harvard Theological Review Vol.87, No.3, p. 323-46.

External links 

 Wipe Out Amalek, Today? chabad.org
 Amalek, Based on the teachings of the Lubavitcher Rebbe
 Remember Amalek: A lesson in Divine Providence
 Remembering Amalek
 Latznu: Popular Culture and the Disciples of Amalek
 Antiquities of the Jews - by Josephus Flavius
 The Jewish Encyclopedia, 1901-6: Amalek
 A Kabbalistic view of Amalek
 Amalec - Catholic Encyclopedia article
 Between Rephidim and Jerusalem - Amalek symbolism in relations between Israelis and Palestinians
 Contemporary Amalek - Hirhurim - a blog post by Rabbi Gil Student explaining Rav Soloveitchik's controversial view that the Nazis were considered Amalekites
 "Amalek" (Passages 1999) A discussion with R. Eliezer Breitowitz & Dr. Elliott Malamet

 
Edom
Esau
Hebrew Bible nations
Torah people
Massacres in the Bible